The twenty-seventh series of the British reality television programme The Only Way Is Essex began airing on 14 March 2021, and concluded following eleven episodes on 23 May. This series returned to airing just one episode per week, and like the previous series, it was filmed with social distancing measures in place to protect both cast and crew from Coronavirus. Despite filming for this series taking place during a national lockdown, some restaurants and pubs opened especially for the show. Ahead of the series it was announced that cast member Yazmin Oukhellou had quit the show to focus on a new career. It was also confirmed that Rem Larue had joined the cast instead. This series also features the arrivals of new cast members Dani Imbert and Roman Hackett. as well as the departures of Georgia Kousoulou, Tommy Mallet and Joey Turner.

Cast

Episodes

{| class="wikitable plainrowheaders" style="width:100%; background:#fff;"
! style="background:#FB65FE;"| Seriesno.
! style="background:#FB65FE;"| Episodeno.
! style="background:#FB65FE;"| Title
! style="background:#FB65FE;"| Original air date
! style="background:#FB65FE;"| Duration
! style="background:#FB65FE;"| UK viewers

|}

Ratings
Catch-up service totals were added to the official ratings.

References

The Only Way Is Essex
2021 British television seasons
Media depictions of the COVID-19 pandemic in the United Kingdom
Television shows about the COVID-19 pandemic